Magnus Alexander Ludwig von Güldenstubbe (tr.) was a Baltic German general of the Imperial Russian Army and commanded the Moscow Military District from 1864 to 1879. He participated in November Uprising in Poland and the Crimean War.

Biography

Origin 
He was from the Baltic German and Swedish Güldenstubbe family (de), which was originally named Knutzen (or Knutson) and originated from either Holstein or Denmark.

Awards 
  Order of St. Vladimir, 4th class (1837)
  Order of St. Vladimir, 3rd class (1845)
  Order of St. George, 4th class (1847)
  Order of St. Stanislaus, 1st class (1848)
  Order of St. Anna, 1st class (1849)
  Order of St. Vladimir, 2nd class (1855)
  Order of the White Eagle (1856)
  Order of St. Alexander Nevsky (1863)
  Order of St. Vladimir, 1st class (1872)
  Order of St. Andrew (1875)

Notes

Citations

Sources
 Essen, Nicolai von. Genealogical Handbook of Oesel's Knighthood. Tartu (1935)
 Welding, Olaf. Baltic German Biographical Dictionary 1710-1960. (1970), from the Baltic Biographical Dictionary Digital 

1801 births
1884 deaths
Russian people of the November Uprising
Russian military personnel of the Crimean War
Recipients of the Order of St. Vladimir, 4th class
Recipients of the Order of St. Vladimir, 3rd class
Recipients of the Order of Saint Stanislaus (Russian), 1st class
Recipients of the Order of St. Anna, 1st class
Recipients of the Order of St. Vladimir, 2nd class
Recipients of the Order of the White Eagle (Russia)
Recipients of the Order of St. Vladimir, 1st class